Mohammad Jorjandi (born 21 November 1980 in Zahedan) is a cybercrime expert, one of the first Iranian hackers and the director of Shabgard security group. He was arrested by the Iranian Ministry of Intelligence in 2010 for hacking website of Azad University to insult Ayatollah Hashemi Rafsanjani and also accessing to emails that contained confidential information while doing a Penetration test on IRIB. He spent several months in Evin Prison. 

After his release, he was hired by Central Bank of Iran as the director of Kashef (Bank Emergency Network Security Control Center). After some time, he was fired from Central Bank due to his case in Ministry of Intelligence. He immigrated to United States from Iran in 2015. After his immigration, he started studying cyber security, a branch of cybercrime, and created a social media called "Webamooz", to investigate cybercrimes in Iran. Jorjandi published large cases of cybercrimes committed in Iran in Webamooz. He was one the first people to investigate the illegal gambling network in Iran and ever since he has attracted people's attention to himself and his media. Jorjandi currently resides in Alexandria, Virginia, USA, and works for a cybersecurity company.

References

1980 births
Iranian hackers
Living people
People from Zahedan